Igor de Carvalho Julião (born 23 August 1994 in Rio de Janeiro), commonly known as Igor Julião, is a Brazilian footballer who plays as a right back for Vizela.

Personal life
Unlike  most Brazilian footballers, Julião likes to read German philosopher Friedrich Nietzsche and he is also a fan of Mexican painter Frida Kahlo.

Career statistics

Notes

References

External links
 
fluminense.com Profile

1994 births
Living people
Brazilian footballers
Brazilian expatriate footballers
Brazil youth international footballers
Brazil under-20 international footballers
Association football defenders
Campeonato Brasileiro Série A players
Major League Soccer players
Fluminense FC players
Sporting Kansas City players
Expatriate soccer players in the United States
Macaé Esporte Futebol Clube players
Campeonato Brasileiro Série B players
2. Liga (Slovakia) players
Footballers from Rio de Janeiro (city)